Colored Musicians Club is a historic jazz club located Buffalo, New York. Opened in 1935, it is home to the oldest continuously operating African American musicians' organization in the United States.

It was listed on the National Register of Historic Places in 2018. As of 2021, the Colored Musicians Club is undergoing a massive reconstruction and renovation including expansion of the upstairs performance venue and installation of an elevator.  There is a planned reopening Spring of 2022.

References

External links

1935 establishments in New York (state)
African-American history of New York (state)
Jazz clubs in New York (state)
Music venues in New York (state)
National Register of Historic Places in Buffalo, New York
Nightclubs in New York (state)